Beltrami is an Italian surname. Notable people with the surname include:

Eugenio Beltrami (1835-1900), Italian mathematician
Giacomo Beltrami (1779-1855), Italian count for whom the Minnesota county is named, and who claimed (inaccurately) to have discovered the Mississippi River headwaters
Joseph Beltrami (1932-2015), Scottish lawyer
Luca Beltrami (1854-1933), Italian architect, restorer
Marco Beltrami (born 1966), Italian-American film composer

Italian-language surnames